Khoshkeh Dul may refer to:
 Khoshkeh Dul, Zhavehrud, Kamyaran County
 Khoshkeh Dul, Sanandaj